Full Flava are Rob Derbyshire and Paul Solomon, a Birmingham, England production team assisted by backing singer Tee, that specialize in producing R&B and soul records for many established artists such as Chantay Savage, Beverlei Brown, Ruby Turner, Carleen Anderson, Hazel Fernandes, Alison Limerick, CeCe Peniston, and Donna Gardier.

Discography

Albums

Singles

References

External links
 Full Flava official website

 Full Flava on Discogs

British record producers
Living people
Year of birth missing (living people)